Mikhail Gorbachev, the last leader of the Soviet Union, was featured in a 1998 television advertisement for Pizza Hut. It was filmed in November 1997 on Red Square and in a Pizza Hut restaurant elsewhere in Moscow. It was aired internationally in January 1998, but not in Russia.

In the commercial, a family inside the Pizza Hut restaurant discusses Gorbachev's political legacy. The younger man and the older man disagree, until the older lady says that Gorbachev gave them Pizza Hut. Gorbachev used the money he earned to finance projects by his foundation. The commercial has been described as illustrative of the victory of capitalism inside the former Soviet Union.

Content 

The commercial starts with an aerial view of the Cathedral of Christ the Saviour and Manezhnaya Square from the viewpoint of the Four Seasons Hotel Moscow after a recent snowfall. Then Gorbachev is walking through the snow with an umbrella, together with his granddaughter Anastasia Virganskaya while Saint Basil's Cathedral is visible in the background. They enter the Pizza Hut restaurant at Red Square and take a seat at a table in the corner.

A family in the restaurant is sitting at a different table. The father (played by Richard Marner) notices Gorbachev and complains, "Because of him we have economic confusion." "Because of him, we have opportunity", the son protests. The claim is followed by counterclaim: "Because of him, we have political instability" – "Because of him, we have freedom" – "Complete chaos" – "Hope!". The mother interjects: "Because of him we have many things... like Pizza Hut." Now the family agrees. They and the whole restaurant rise from their seats, pizza slices in hand, to salute his achievements. The camera cuts to Gorbachev himself, basking in the attention.

The voiceover says: "Sometimes, nothing brings people together better than a nice hot pizza from Pizza Hut." The chorus of acclamations is heard even more loudly, as if resonating throughout Moscow. At the end, the slogan "Good friends. Great pizza." is shown. A different version was made that included the slogan "Have you been to the edge?".

Background 

Pizza Hut opened in 1990 in Moscow, a few months after the first McDonald's in Russia opened. It was one of the first foreign-owned restaurants that was able to open in Soviet Russia, thanks in part to Gorbachev's own perestroika policies. The idea for a Pizza Hut in Moscow came from a personal friendship between Soviet Ambassador to the United States Anatoly Dobrynin and Donald M. Kendall, CEO of Pizza Hut's parent company PepsiCo. It was part of the largest deal ever between the Soviet Union and an American corporation. The arrangement flopped after the Soviet Union collapsed, which killed Pizza Hut's supply chain.

Pizza Hut had frequently ordered advertisements from BBDO before. BBDO art director Ted Shaine recalled that the company "heard that [Gorbachev] was willing to do something", but others suggest BBDO came up with the idea themselves.

It took months to negotiate a deal. Katie O'Neill Bistrian at IMG negotiated for Gorbachev. The long duration was partly to increase the fee for Gorbachev, but also represented real hesitation on his part. His wife Raisa Gorbacheva feared that the ad could harm his reputation. Gorbachev agreed under the conditions that he could give his final approval over the script. He would also not eat pizza, which disappointed Pizza Hut. O'Neill Bistrian suggested that a member of Gorbachev's family would eat the pizza slice, which ended up being his granddaughter.

The exact amount that Gorbachev received was never disclosed, although it was argued that it was one of the largest talent fees in history. According to The New York Times, some reports indicate Gorbachev was paid close to US$1 million (equivalent to about $M in ). Gorbachev said the money would be used for The Gorbachev Foundation, and was quoted in CNN saying:

Production 

O'Neill Bistrian, the director Peter Smillie and several others flew to Moscow in November 1997. The preproduction took several days. The principal photography took place over two days.  Gorbachev arrived late, in a limousine. Red Square was shut down for a day during the filming. The Pizza Hut shown on Red Square was actually a jewelry store which was changed for the filming. The filming inside was done in an actual Pizza Hut restaurant in Moscow.  For taking the shots of Red Square and churches, the crew hefted the film cameras on the Kremlin itself.  Some challenges included the weather, which meant a low temperature and low light.  The commercial was edited afterward by Clayton Hemmert from the firm Crew Cuts. He played a key role in shaping the ending of the commercial, by adding reverberation and layering chants over each other.  The production costs were estimated to be in the low millions of dollars.

Broadcast and reception 
The commercial was broadcast in the United States during the 1998 Rose Bowl football game on January 1, but not in Russia where Gorbachev was widely criticized in the media for taking part in the advertisement. Years after the initial broadcast, the commercial became a viral video on multiple occasions. Time listed the commercial in a "Top 10 Embarrassing Celebrity Commercials" list. Thrillist named it in a 2014 article as one of the 11 most bizarre celebrity endorsements. In a 2010 interview by the Russian magazine Snob, Gorbachev stated that he received various letters of support.

Analysis 
Gorbachev has been described as a bystander to the drama occurring in the commercial. It has been described as a "beautiful film and weird advertisement" and as exploiting the shock value of having a former world leader appear. The ad also played on the fact that Gorbachev was far more popular outside Russia than inside it.

The commercial suggested that capitalism was better than communism because it made Pizza Hut possible. In 2012, Nadia Kaneva and Elza Ibroscheva wrote that Gorbachev's appearance in the Pizza Hut ad—as well as his appearance in a 2007 Louis Vuitton print ad for which he was photographed by Annie Leibovitz—symbolized "the passing of communism and the triumph of the new, capitalist, and consumerist order" with Gorbachev's transformation  "into a commercial spokesman for powerful Western brands" and the "co-optation of [his] iconic status for marketing purposes" serving as an ironic symbol of "his irrelevance as a political figure in the post-communist context."

Further developments 

In October 1998, Pizza Hut left Moscow, but they returned in March 2000. 

Gorbachev has stated to The Guardian that he lost his savings due to the 1998 Russian financial crisis.

In 1997 Gorbachev told CNN that he did not plan to participate in advertisements again. In 2000, however, Gorbachev was featured in an advertisement made in Vienna by Demner, Merlicek & Bergmann for the ÖBB, the Austrian federal railways. The slogan was "Perestroika in the ÖBB" and was filmed at the Wien Floridsdorf railway station. The ad was broadcast on ORF for the first time on May 10, 2000. In 2007, Gorbachev was featured in a photograph advertisement taken by Annie Leibovitz for Louis Vuitton in a car next to remaining parts of the Berlin Wall. Unlike the Pizza Hut commercial, this advertisement was shown in Russia.

Pizza Hut suspended operations of their 50 Russian outlets in response to the 2022 Russian invasion of Ukraine.

In the hours following Gorbachev's death, Pizza Hut became a trending topic on Twitter.

See also 
 Television in Russia

Notes

References

External links 
 Gorbachev Pizza Hut commercial on YouTube
 Gorbachev and Pizza Hut on France 24

1990s television commercials
American television commercials
commercials featuring Mikhail Gorbachev
Pizza Hut
Viral videos